"" (meaning 'Salute to The Sultan') is the national anthem of the Sultanate of Oman. It is an ode originally dedicated to Qaboos bin Said (1940–2020), the former Sultan of Oman.

History
"" was written by poet Rashid bin Uzayyiz Al Khusaidi. The music for it was composed at the request of Muscat's government by James Frederick Mills, a Briton, in December 1932.

In 1970, a modified version was written by the poet Ħafiẓ ben-Sâlem as-Sayl al-Gasâni, the adviser of the former Sultan of Oman, Qaboos bin Said. The melody was composed by Egyptian musician Mohammed Abdel Wahab.

Lyrics

Current lyrics

Previous lyrics (Qaboos-era version)
In 2020, Sultan Haitham bin Tariq issued a decree to remove the name of his predecessor, Sultan Qaboos bin Said, from the national anthem.

Notes

References

External links

 Oman: Nashid as-Salaam as-Sultani – Audio of the national anthem of Oman, with information and lyrics (archive link)
 Vocal version of "Nashid as-Salaam as-Sultani" in MP3

Asian anthems
National symbols of Oman
Omani music
Royal anthems
National anthem compositions in G major